The Best of Pete Townshend (sometimes listed with the subtitle [coolwalkingsmoothtalkingstraightsmokingfirestoking], after a lyric from the song "Misunderstood" which is printed on the front cover) is a compilation album by Pete Townshend released in 1996. It was released in the UK on the Virgin label, and the US on Atlantic. The compilation included songs from Pete Townshend's solo career as well as two songs from the album Rough Mix with Ronnie Lane. It also included the single edit of English Boy" and the first appearance of "Let My Love Open the Door (E. Cola Mix)" and the Psychoderelict outtake, "Uneasy Street".

Track listing
"Rough Boys"
"Let My Love Open the Door"
"Misunderstood"
"Give Blood"
"A Friend Is a Friend"
"Sheraton Gibson"
"English Boy" [non-dialog version]
"Street in the City"
"Pure and Easy"
"Slit Skirts"
"The Sea Refuses No River"
"A Little Is Enough"
"Face the Face"
"Uneasy Street"
"Let My Love Open the Door (E. Cola Mix)"

References

1996 compilation albums
Pete Townshend compilation albums